Kamerlengo (Kaštel Kamerlengo) is a castle and fortress in Trogir, Croatia.

History
The castle was built in the mid-15th century by Marin Radoj as part of an expansion of the Veriga Tower, built on the site in the late 14th century. It is used as a location for performances during the summer months. The word kamerlengo (Italian: camerlengo) refers to the title of an administrative official (a chamberlain).

See also
Croatia
Trogir
Klis Fortress
Dalmatia

References 

Castles in Croatia

History of Trogir
Buildings and structures in Split-Dalmatia County
Tourist attractions in Split-Dalmatia County
Lowland castles